John Buffalo Mailer (born April 16, 1978) is an American author, playwright, actor, producer, and journalist.

Life and career
Mailer was born in Brooklyn, the youngest child of novelist Norman Mailer and author Norris Church Mailer.  Mailer is a graduate of Wesleyan University.  He has written several screenplays and is a freelance journalist.  In 2006 he co-wrote The Big Empty (Nation Books, February '06)  with his father.

Mailer founded Back House Productions in New York City with three other Wesleyan grads in October 2000. The following year, Back House became the resident theater company of The Drama Bookshop's Arthur Seelan Theater, and developed, among many plays, the 2008 Tony winner for Best Musical, In The Heights. On being involved in theatre, Mailer says: "I think theater will always be a powerful force because we need that human touch, particularly as we spend more and more time with machines, cell phones, computers we start to lose our humanity."

In 2001, Mailer's first play, Hello Herman, had its New York Premiere at the Grove Street Playhouse and nine years later, its West Coast Premiere at the Edgemar Center for the Arts in Los Angeles with Mailer in the lead role. The result was Dramatists Play Services publishing the play in the Spring of 2010. Mailer's second play, Crazy Eyes, premiered in Athens, Greece in 2005.

Mailer portrays the character Robby Mancins, an Options trader and the best friend of Shia LaBeouf's character Jake Moore, in Oliver Stone's Wall Street 2: Money Never Sleeps. He is a member of The Dramatists' Guild, Actor's Equity Association, SAG and The Actors Studio, has lectured at the University of Notre Dame, Wesleyan, the University of Athens, Syracuse University, The New York Society for Ethical Culture, The Dorothy Chandler Pavilion in Los Angeles, Long Island University, and has appeared on Hannity and Combs, Air America, Democracy Now, WNYC, CSPAN's Book TV, and thebigthink.com. He has freelanced for Playboy, New York Magazine, Provincetown Arts, Lid, Stop Smiling, Corriera De La Sera, The Norman Mailer Review, ESPN Books and The American Conservative.

Mailer's work can be seen on screen in the film Hello Herman directed by Michelle Danner, which opened nationwide and on-demand on June 7, 2013.

Mailer was included as one of People Magazine men "On the Verge" in 2002. He lives in Brooklyn with his wife, Claudia Maree Mailer.

Plays 
 Hello Herman (2001)
 Crazy Eyes
 Dracula on Stage

Filmography, as an actor
 1999: Black and White (1999 TV film)
 2002: Up to the Roof
 2006: Kettle of Fish (film)
 2008: W.
 2010: Wall Street: Money Never Sleeps
 2016: Blind

As producer 
 2008: The End of America
 2002: Up to the Roof

As writer 
 2002: Up to the Roof
 2011: Hello, Herman Film Adaptation

References

External links

 John Mailer on Film, Theatre & Writing: Big Think Interview nthWORD Magazine Shorts

1978 births
American male dramatists and playwrights
American dramatists and playwrights
American male journalists
American male screenwriters
American people of South African-Jewish descent
Jewish American dramatists and playwrights
Living people
Wesleyan University alumni
21st-century American Jews